Christelle d'Intorni (born 2 May 1985) is a French politician from The Republicans (LR) who has represented Alpes-Maritimes's 5th constituency the National Assembly since 2022.

See also 

 List of deputies of the 16th National Assembly of France

References 

Living people
1985 births
Deputies of the 16th National Assembly of the French Fifth Republic
21st-century French politicians
21st-century French women politicians
Women members of the National Assembly (France)
The Republicans (France) politicians
People from Nice